Maung Maung Tin (born 21 May 1949) is a Burmese footballer. He competed in the men's tournament at the 1972 Summer Olympics.

References

External links
 

1949 births
Living people
Burmese footballers
Myanmar international footballers
Olympic footballers of Myanmar
Footballers at the 1972 Summer Olympics
Place of birth missing (living people)
Association football defenders
Competitors at the 1969 Southeast Asian Peninsular Games
Southeast Asian Games medalists in football
Southeast Asian Games gold medalists for Myanmar
1968 AFC Asian Cup players
Footballers at the 1970 Asian Games
Footballers at the 1974 Asian Games
Asian Games medalists in football
Asian Games gold medalists for Myanmar
Medalists at the 1970 Asian Games